Sinthusa is a genus of lycaenid butterflies, the sparks. They are small species with the male genitalia and secondary sexual characters of Virachola, but less robust and weaker in flight. The males are easily recognized, with the forewings oily indigo blue changing to shining blue in a side light and hindwings shining violet blue in all lights. The species of this genus are found in the Indomalayan realm. The genus was erected by Frederic Moore in 1884.

Species
Sinthusa chandrana Moore
Sinthusa peregrinus Staudinger
Sinthusa nasaka Horsfield
Sinthusa malika Horsfield
Sinthusa privata Fruhstorfer
Sinthusa kawazoei H. Hayashi, 1976
Sinthusa virgo Elwes
Sinthusa makikoae H. Hayashi & Ohtsuka
Sinthusa mindanensis H. Hayashi, Schröder & Treadaway
Sinthusa natsumiae H. Hayashi
Sinthusa stephaniae H. Hayashi, Schröder & Treadaway

References
 Seitz, A., 1924-1927: The Macrolepidoptera of the World, 9: 903–1026. Stuttgart.
 Eliot J.N., 1992: In Corbet & Pendlebury. The Butterflies of the Malay Peninsula, 4th ed. x+595pp, 69pls. Kuala Lumpur.
 Treadaway, Colin G., 1995: Checklist of the Butterflies of the Philippine Islands. Nachrichten des Entomologischen Vereins Apollo, Suppl. 14: 7–118.
 Seki, Y., Takanami, Y. & Otsuka K., 1991: Butterflies of Borneo, Lycaenidae. 2 (1): 1–113. Toboshima Corporation. Tokyo.
 Treadaway, Colin G. & Schröder, Heinz, 2012: Revised Checklist of the Butterflies of the Philippine Islands. Nachrichten des Entomologischen Vereins Apollo, Suppl. 20: 1-64.

External links
 With images.
"Sinthusa Moore 1884". Tree of Life Web Project. Retrieved January 15, 2020.

 
Deudorigini
Lycaenidae genera
Taxa named by Frederic Moore